Haunting Me may refer to:

 Haunting Me (film), a 2007 Thai horror-comedy film
 "Haunting Me" (V Capri song)
 "Haunting Me" (Stabbing Westward song)